Clarence L. Munn Ice Arena is a 6,114-seat hockey-only arena in East Lansing, Michigan on the campus of Michigan State University, situated across Chestnut Road from the Intramural Recreative Sports Center West and Spartan Stadium. It is home to the MSU's ice hockey team. Completed in 1974, the arena is named in honor of former MSU football coach and athletic director Clarence "Biggie" Munn.

History 
Munn Arena came to be after debate over building a new basketball or hockey arena in the early 1970s. Plans were to build a new basketball arena and move the ice hockey team to Jenison Fieldhouse. In the end, Michigan State athletic director Burt Smith chose to build a new ice hockey facility to replace Demonstration Hall. Munn Ice Arena was designed by Daverman Associates of Grand Rapids, Michigan. The original design called for 10,000 seats, but MSU was skeptical they could sell that many tickets. Thus instead, they built a 6,250-seat arena.

The MSU ice hockey team moved out of Dem Hall following the 1973–74 season and into Munn Ice Arena on Nov. 1, 1974. Michigan State lost its first regular season game at Munn 4-3 in overtime to defending national champion Minnesota Golden Gophers.

As Michigan State grew into a hockey powerhouse in the 1980s, Munn became home to one of the hottest tickets in the state. Improvements were made to accommodate the program's increasing popularity. In 1985, the heat-exchanger pipes for creating ice were replaced by a direct refrigeration system allowing year-round ice. With increasing coverage, the press box was expanded from one row to two rows accommodating 50 people. A new four-sided scoreboard was added at center ice in 1991. To make handicap-accessible seats, the rink's capacity was reduced to 6,170 in the early 1990s. In 1999–2000, the press box was relocated from center ice to the rink end to make room for 300 club seats on the south end. Luxury boxes were added a year later on the north end of the rink. The additions boosted capacity to 6,470. During the same time the four-sided scoreboard was replaced with two boards at the east and west ends of the rink along with two video replay boards. Recent renovations, which included the installation of additional handicap-accessible platforms, brought capacity to its current 6,114.

For its first 20 years Munn Ice Arena was the premier on-campus collegiate hockey facility in the country. It is still recognized as one of the top campus hockey rinks in the NCAA.  It is also used for high school and amateur hockey and ice skating.

A job at Munn is one of the most highly sought after student jobs on Michigan State's campus.  The employees have referred to themselves as "Munnsters" (a reference to the 1960s TV show with an intentional misspelling), a title which has recently replaced the word "staff" on employee uniforms.

Sell-out streak 
Munn Ice Arena was home to the NCAA's longest consecutive regular-season sell-out streak. On Dec. 19, 1985, Michigan State produced a sell-out crowd versus Northern Michigan University. Michigan State went on to sell-out 323 consecutive regular season home games. The streak ended on Oct. 15, 2004 when Munn failed to fill to capacity for a game against St. Lawrence University.

Memorable games
November 6, 1974 – vs. North Dakota – The first sell-out crowd in Munn history watches goalie Ron Clark stop a record 30 first-period shots in a 6-2 win over North Dakota.
March 14, 1976 – vs. Minnesota – Michigan State is upset by Minnesota in triple overtime during the WCHA playoffs. The loss cost the Spartan squad, one of the best to that date, a berth in the NCAA tournament. The game lasted over 86 minutes.
March 3, 1979 – vs. Michigan – In Amo Bessone's final game as head coach Michigan State completes a two-game sweep of Michigan with a 5-3 win.
March 18, 1984 – vs. Boston College – With a 7-6 victory over the Eagles, Michigan State advances to their first NCAA Frozen Four since 1967.
December 15, 1985 – vs. Ohio State – Senior Mike Donnelly scores a Spartan-record five goals including the overtime game-winning goal in a 6-5 win over the Buckeyes. Donnelly had tallied a hat trick in the previous night's contest with the Buckeyes.
February 22, 1986 – vs. Lake Superior State – With three teams (Lake Superior State, Michigan State and Western Michigan) tied for first place in the CCHA heading into the final two games of the season, Michigan State defeats Lake Superior State 5-4 in a dramatic overtime game on the final night of the season. The victory and a Western Michigan loss gave MSU sole possession of the CCHA title.
February 12, 1993 – vs. Kent State – A 6-5 win over the Golden Flashes made head coach Ron Mason the winningest coach in NCAA ice hockey history with 674 wins.
November 2, 1996 – vs. Michigan – Unranked Michigan State upsets defending national champion and No. 1 ranked Michigan 5-4. The loss cost the Wolverines the top spot in the polls for one week — the only week the Wolverines were not ranked No. 1 that season. The victory completed a weekend sweep as MSU recorded an 8-2 win over No. 3 ranked Bowling Green State the previous night.
February 20, 1998 – vs. Michigan – The Spartans hand the Wolverines a 5-1 loss giving Ron Mason win No. 800. After the victory, students poured onto the ice celebrating the milestone. The celebration was featured on ESPN's SportsCenter.
February 28, 1998 – vs. Ferris State – On Senior Night, senior goalie Chad Alban scores an empty-net goal with 13 seconds remaining in a 6-3 win over the Bulldogs.
February 10, 2001 – vs. Alaska – Sophomore goalie Ryan Miller records his 17th shutout of his career in a 3-0 win over the Nanooks. No. 17 gives Miller the NCAA record for career shutouts. Miller ended his three-year career with 26 shutouts.
March 1, 2001 – vs. Michigan – An over-capacity crowd of 7,121, the second-largest crowd in Munn history, watch MSU beat archrival UM 3-1 on Senior Night.
March 9, 2002 – vs. Bowling Green State – In his final game at Munn as head coach, Ron Mason delivers a 4-2 victory over the Falcons to advance to the CCHA Semifinals in Detroit.

Attendance facts
Munn Ice Arena was home to the NCAA's longest regular-season sell-out streak of 323 games from December 19, 1985 to October 15, 2004
There have been a total of 467 sellouts in Munn's 32-year history.
The largest single season attendance total was 157,567 in 1975–76.
The largest single season attendance average was 6,722 in 1986–87.
The largest two-game series crowd was 13,834 on Feb. 11-12, 2000 versus Northern Michigan.

Top 10 largest crowds
1. – 7,225 – Nov. 10, 2012 – vs. Michigan – W 7-2
2. – 7,121 – March 1, 2001 – vs. Michigan – W 3-1
3. – 7,117 – Jan. 7, 2000 – vs. Michigan – L 2-0
4 – 7,113 – Feb. 15, 2003 – vs. Michigan – W 5-3
5. – 7,099 – Nov 14, 2009 – vs. Michigan – W 2-0
6. – 7,092 – Nov. 3, 2006 – vs. Michigan – W 7-4
7. – 7,072 – Jan. 26, 2008 – vs. Michigan – T 2-2 OT
8. – 6,991 – Feb. 12, 2000 – vs. Northern Michigan – W 2-0
9. – 6,953 – March 4, 2000 – vs. Notre Dame – W 5-3
10. – 6,943 – Feb. 11, 2000 – vs. Northern Michigan – W 3-2 OT

External links
 Munn Ice Arena (official Web Site)

Indoor arenas in Michigan
College ice hockey venues in the United States
Sports venues in Michigan
Indoor ice hockey venues in the United States
Michigan State University
Michigan State Spartans ice hockey
Michigan State University campus
Sports venues completed in 1974
1974 establishments in Michigan